Kris TV was a Philippine morning talk show that was broadcast by ABS-CBN, hosted by Kris Aquino. The show premiered on June 27, 2011, and aired every weekday mornings from 7:30AM to 9:00AM on the network's Umaganda morning block. It also aired worldwide via TFC. The show concluded on April 15, 2016. It was replaced by Magandang Buhay on its timeslot.

The show was later cancelled in 2016 after Aquino decided to leave ABS-CBN due to health conditions and to spend more time with her family.

History
Kris Aquino stated on her Twitter account that her defunct talk show Today with Kris Aquino will be back on air, but as the days passed, she announced that she will return on a talk show but will be entitled as Kris TV.

Kris TV premiered on June 27, 2011 from 9:30AM to 10:30AM on ABS-CBN's Umaganda morning block, right before the talent competition program Showtime (later known as the noontime show It's Showtime.)

On June 4, 2012, Kris TV moved to an earlier timeslot from 8:00AM to 9:00AM, right before the Filipino-dubbed Japanese anime shows under the Team Animazing morning animation block.

On February 10, 2014, Kris TV extended its timeslot from 7:30AM to 9:00AM, replacing 30 minutes of the morning program Umagang Kay Ganda. In the same year, the show is later reformatted as a lifestyle magazine talk show.

Format
Kris TV aims to focus on everyday lifestyle and educational places to go that housewives, husbands and kids can relate to. Aquino's talk show varies different topics and segments not only limiting to interviews, but also to everyday life and bonding moments among the audience and the special guests.

The show airs taped Mondays to Fridays with out-of-studio tours, in which Kris Aquino travels around the Philippines to showcase the country's beauty and essence to the Filipino audiences, with a guest celebrity joining her to have an interview on location. In recent years, the program does not accommodate a studio set-up anymore; instead, they do live episodes in Aquino's residence or in a resto-bar, with guests joining her for a talk show or musical set-up.

Segments and spin-offs
Kris RealiTV
One of the regular spin-offs of Kris TV. The talk show does not only feature on-studio and live programs, they travel around the country to showcase its beauty to television viewers, be it Filipinos or foreigners.

Kris & Bimby Summer TV
A Kris TV summer spin-off aired in 2015, featuring a mother-and-son bonding with Kris Aquino and Bimby Aquino Yap in their summer adventures, foodtrips and roadtrips. The theme song was performed by Darren Espanto.

Foodtrip
In occasional episodes, Kris Aquino (often accompanied by her friends and guests, her sons, and headwriter Darla) goes to restaurants in and out of the Metro to showcase delicious, mouth-watering dishes that television viewers can try. It shows Filipino authentic dishes, as well as foreign dishes.

Hosts
Main host
Kris Aquino-Yap (2011–2016)

Co-hosts
Darla Sauler (2011–2016)
Bimby Aquino Yap (2011–2016)
Joshua Aquino (2011–2016)
Francis Escudero (2012)

Regular guests

Aiko Melendez
Ogie Diaz
Marlo Mortel
Janella Salvador
Daniel Matsunaga
Claudine Barretto
Iza Calzado
Isabelle Daza
KC Concepcion
Vice Ganda
Karla Estrada
Melai Cantiveros-Francisco
Jolina Magdangal
K Brosas
Pokwang
Pooh
Chokoleit
Kakai Bautista
John Lapus
Carmina Villaroel-Legaspi
Kim Chiu
Toni Gonzaga
Bianca Gonzalez
Andrea Brillantes
Darren Espanto
Juan Karlos Labajo
Jed Madela
Angeline Quinto
Erik Santos
Kyla

Awards and nominations

Cancellation
After four and a half years of broadcast, Kris TV announced its final episode which aired on March 23, 2016. Kris Aquino stated that she will be leaving ABS-CBN due to health conditions and spending more time with her family. After the final episode, the show continued to air with re-runs of selected episodes entitled The Best of Kris TV. The program cancelled on April 15, 2016 and was replaced by Magandang Buhay on the following week.

See also
List of programs broadcast by ABS-CBN
Today with Kris Aquino
Boy & Kris

References

External links

ABS-CBN original programming
Philippine television talk shows
Breakfast television in the Philippines
2011 Philippine television series debuts
2016 Philippine television series endings
Filipino-language television shows